Ilkka Antero Jouko Sinisalo (July 10, 1958 – April 5, 2017) was a Finnish professional ice hockey forward who played eleven seasons in the National Hockey League (NHL) for the Philadelphia Flyers, Minnesota North Stars and Los Angeles Kings. Later he was a scout for the Flyers.

Playing career
Sinisalo was originally a junior product of HIFK. He played in the NHL from 1981–1992, scoring 204 goals and 426 points, mostly with the Flyers. Sinisalo is ranked as the all-time leading goal scorer among European Philadelphia Flyers. He is also ranked the fourth-highest Finnish goal scorer in NHL history, and he was honored by induction to the Finnish Hockey Hall of Fame in 1997.

When Sinisalo started his ice hockey career in the 1970s, NHL teams did not scout extensively in Finland. The first Finnish ice hockey player in NHL was Matti Hagman for the 1976–77 Boston Bruins. However, NHL scouts were so impressed by Sinisalo's talents that they made an exception by signing him as a free agent after his 1980–81 season with HIFK, where he scored 27 goals in 36 games. He signed his first NHL contract on February 17, 1981. Sinisalo started his first season with the Flyers with his first NHL goal against the Pittsburgh Penguins. Sinisalo became the first Flyer to score his first NHL goal on a penalty shot, and the third NHL player at that time. During the 1984–85 season, Sinisalo scored 73 points in 70 games, with a +32 rating. The 1989–90 season was Sinisalo's last with the Flyers, after which he played one season for the Minnesota North Stars and two seasons for the Los Angeles Kings.

Sinisalo retired from hockey in 1996, last playing for the Kiekko-Espoo in the SM-Liiga.

Career after retirement
After playing his last season of professional ice hockey for Kiekko-Espoo in 1995–96 in Finland he took a job as the general manager of the club. He served as Kiekko-Espoo GM until 1998–99. He was then hired by San Jose Sharks general manager Dean Lombardi on September 12, 1998 as a European-based scout for the Sharks. In July 2004, he was back in the Flyers organization as their European scout.

Personal life
Sinisalo's son Tomas is a professional ice hockey player, primarily in Finland, having attended the Flyers' training camp in 2009.

Sinisalo died as a result of prostate cancer on April 5, 2017.

Career statistics

Regular season and playoffs

International

References

External links
 

1958 births
2017 deaths
Deaths from cancer in Finland
Deaths from prostate cancer
Espoo Blues players
Finnish ice hockey right wingers
HIFK (ice hockey) players
HPK players
Ilves players
Los Angeles Kings players
Minnesota North Stars players
Oulun Kärpät players
People from Valkeakoski
Philadelphia Flyers players
Philadelphia Flyers scouts
Phoenix Roadrunners (IHL) players
San Jose Sharks scouts
Undrafted National Hockey League players
Sportspeople from Pirkanmaa